Rocca de' Baldi is a comune (municipality) in the Province of Cuneo in the Italian region Piedmont, located about  south of Turin and about  northeast of Cuneo.

Rocca de' Baldi borders the following municipalities: Magliano Alpi, Mondovì, Morozzo, and Sant'Albano Stura.

References

Cities and towns in Piedmont